Cabin Creek is an unincorporated community in Kanawha County, West Virginia, United States. Cabin Creek is located on the south bank of the Kanawha River at the mouth of Cabin Creek, southeast of Chesapeake. A notable resident was Adam Clayton Powell, Sr. and his family, who had moved there from Virginia.  An exit on the West Virginia Turnpike is located near here.

Notable people
Adam Clayton Powell, Sr. (1865-1953), his parents moved here with Adam and his siblings before 1880, and lived here several years. He married his wife near here in 1889 before going to Washington, DC to Wayland Seminary. He later became the pastor of Abyssinian Baptist Church in Harlem, New York, attracting the largest Protestant congregation in the nation.
Hercules Renda (1917-2005), football player at University of Michigan and coach
Jerry West (b.1938), former NBA player for the Los Angeles Lakers and NBA general manager. West's nicknames included 'Zeke from Cabin Creek' and 'the Cabin Creek Comet'

References

Unincorporated communities in Kanawha County, West Virginia
Unincorporated communities in West Virginia
Populated places on the Kanawha River